Rare Americans are a Canadian alternative rock band from Vancouver, British Columbia, most noted as Juno Award nominees for Breakthrough Group of the Year at the Juno Awards of 2023.

The band was created by brothers James and Jared Priestner, and includes guitarists Lubo Ivan and Jan Cajka and drummer Duran Ritz. They are known for creating animated videos for most of their songs.

At the Juno Awards of 2020, Ben Kaplan won the Jack Richardson Producer of the Year Award for his work on Rare Americans' "Brittle Bones Nicky" and Mother Mother's "It's Alright".

Discography

Albums

Extended plays

Singles

References

Canadian alternative rock groups
Musical groups from Vancouver